Whomp 'Em, the North American version of the Japanese game  (1990), is a platform game released on the Nintendo Entertainment System in March 1991.  It is named after Wampum.

Gameplay

Whomp 'Em is a platform game with some similarities to the Mega Man and Mario series.

After completing the first stage, the player can play the other six in any order. Each of the stages revolves around elements, such as fire and water. After each stage, the player gains a new weapon, much like in the original Mega Man series, which was extremely popular at the time. Both Whomp 'Em and the prior Saiyūki World (which was an adaptation of Wonder Boy in Monster Land) are based on the Journey to the West novel.

Release 
The game was released in Japan for the Famicom on December 7, 1990. The North American version of the game removed references to Journey to the West, by editing the game's sprite and graphics. The first stage music was also slightly modified and included a percussion track using the NES noise channel. The protagonist in the original was Sun Wukong, but is now a Native American, and the setting was changed to the Old West.

Reception

The North American video gaming magazine Nintendo Power gave Whomp 'Em an overall rating of 3.1 out of 5 in its May 1991 review. Allgame editor Brett Alan Weiss praised the game, describing it as "a solid platform game with crisp, clear graphics, peppy music, excellent controls, and a heroic character".

References

External links
Official Website (in Japanese)

1990 video games
City Connection franchises
Jaleco games
Nintendo Entertainment System games
Nintendo Entertainment System-only games
Platform games
Side-scrolling video games
Single-player video games
Video games based on Chinese mythology
Video games based on Native American mythology
Video games developed in Japan
Video games scored by Tsukasa Tawada
Video game sequels
Western (genre) video games
Works based on Journey to the West